Qohurd, also rendered as Qohord or Khokhurd or Kukhurd may refer to:
 Qohurd-e Olya
 Qohurd-e Sofla